Donal Burke (born 1998) is an Irish hurler who plays for Dublin Senior Championship club Na Fianna and at inter-county level with the Dublin senior hurling team. He usually lines out as a right corner-forward.

Career statistics

Honours

Dublin
 Leinster Minor Hurling Championship: 2016

References

1998 births
Living people
Na Fianna hurlers
Dublin inter-county hurlers